"The First Fifteen '89–'04 Live" is a live DVD by Australian musician Diesel. It was recorded in March 2003,  at The Metro Theatre, Sydney, Australia.
The DVD was certified gold in Australia in 2006.

Track listing
 "Intro"
 "One More Time" (diesel / Jerry Williams)
 "15 Feet of Snow" (diesel)
 "All Come Together" (diesel / Guy Davies)
 "I've Been Loving You Too Long" (Jerry Butler / Otis Redding)
 "Getta Kick" (diesel / Guy Davies)
 "Faith & Gasoline" (diesel)
 "Come to Me" (diesel)
 "Everybody’s Talkin’" (Fred Neil)
 "Never Miss Your Water" (diesel / Danny Tate)
 "Angel Face" (diesel)
 "Lookin’ For Love" (diesel)
 "Tip of My Tongue" (diesel / Danny Tate)
 "Love Junk" (diesel)
 "Dig" (diesel / Guy Davies)
 "Cry In Shame" (diesel)
 "Darling Of The Universe" (diesel)
" Masterplan" (diesel)
 "Soul Revival" (diesel)
 "Sun Is Shining" (Bob Marley)
 "I Can't Stand the Rain" (Ann Peebles / Donald Bryant / Bernard Miller)
 "Man Alive" (diesel / Thomas De Luca)

Charts

Certification

|-

References

Music video compilation albums
2004 video albums